Stregati (Bewitched) is a 1986 Italian romantic comedy film directed by Francesco Nuti.

For this film Giovanni Nuti won the Nastro d'Argento for best score.

Plot    
Lorenzo is a dj who lives in Genoa, in a loft near the port; he conducts a nocturnal radio program for Radio Strega, keeping company, with his words and sentences, for those who suffer from insomnia or work at night. His philosophy of life, as well as that of his student friends (a taxi driver and a pianist) and his father (manager of a cinema where pornographic films are broadcast), is to fight monotony, always trying to have fun, often even breaking the rules and some female hearts.

Every night, in fact, after work, Lorenzo and his friends wander around the city, combining all kinds of jokes and experiencing occasional adventures. On a rainy night, while driving his friend's taxi, Lorenzo meets Anna, a beautiful girl with whom he ends up in bed; however she is about to get married and is in the Ligurian capital only to buy the wedding dress and then leave for Verona, where her future husband awaits her.

However, the two spend together almost all the time she stays and, between them, a particular relationship is established, poised between attraction and repulsion, but intense. Thus, Anna misses the train of return twice and only on the third attempt does she manage to leave again, not before having made love with Lorenzo again. After a few days, however, when everything seems to be over, Anna returns and returns to Lorenzo, willing to be with him and ready to share his bizarre and messy lifestyle.

Cast 
 Francesco Nuti as Lorenzo 
 Ornella Muti as Anna 
 Novello Novelli as  Novello  
  Alex Partexano as Alex
 Mirta Pepe as Clara
 Sergio Solli as  Remo Quaranta

See also    
 List of Italian films of 1986

References

External links

1986 films
Italian romantic comedy films
Films directed by Francesco Nuti
1986 romantic comedy films
Films with screenplays by Vincenzo Cerami
1980s Italian films